House of Tkhaghapseu (or Tkhagapso) is a Circassian house of peasant origin of Shapsug Princedom of Circassia. They are said to be one of the four largest houses of Circassians in terms of population. They are found all over the historical Circassia in the present day, in Adygea, Krasnodar Krai, Karachay-Cherkessia and Kabardino-Balkaria; as well as in Republic of Turkey and Hashemite Kingdom of Jordan due to Circassian Genocide.

Etymology
There are two distinct explanations of the roots of the surname.

The first and the less famous explanation is that the word Тхьагъэпсэу comes from two different roots, Тхьагъапщ and псэу - Тхьагъапщ being the name of the village where the house had emerged and псэу literally meaning "to live" - translating as "Those who live in Tkhaghapsh".

The widely accepted translation simply means "God bless them" in Circassian.

It tells about the story of three brothers of House of Nartyzh living in the village of Tkhaghapsh, (present-day Tkhagapsh, Lazarevsky City District, Krasnodar Krai, Russia) where a tyrannical feudal prince ruled over the region. The three brothers decided that the reign of the prince must end and he must pay for the atrocities he had committed with his life. They ambushed the prince and killed him, therefore the residents of the region praised them with words "may God bless them, may God bless them" and it stuck with them as a nickname, later to become their surname. The three brothers later fled the region, each leaving for different parts of Circassia in order to avoid the vengeance of the relatives of the tyrannical prince who they had killed. One of them fled to Takhtamukay in present-day Adygea, one of them fled to Khabez in present-day Karachay-Cherkessia and the last one fled to the village of Kuba in present-day Kabardino-Balkaria.

References

Circassian houses